This article shows the 2011 season of South Korean football.

AFC Asian Cup

National team results

Senior team

Under-23 team

K League

Regular season

Championship playoffs

Bracket

Final table

Korean FA Cup

Korean League Cup

Group stage

Group A

Group B

Knockout stage

Korea National League

Regular season

Championship playoff

WK League

Table

Playoff and championship
The playoff is played one leg and championship final is played over two legs.

AFC Champions League

South Korean clubs' score displayed first

See also
Football in South Korea

References

External links

 
Seasons in South Korean football